Kona is a Kenyan primetime telenovela that premiered on Africa Magic Channel on 26 August 2013 to  2014. Starring Nini Wacera, Lwanda Jawar, Abubakar Mwenda, Brenda Wairimu, Muthoni Gathecha and an ensemble cast.

Production 
Prior to the launching of the series, 179 episodes were already published. Filming took place in Dagoretti in Western Nairobi. The show was officially launched on 21 August 2013 in Nairobi.

Plot 
The story follows the not-so-perfect lives of the Oyange family and their struggles deepened by love and hate. When business tycoon Richard Oyage dies in a grisly car accident, he leaves behind a wife, Ayira (Muthoni Gathecha), his first daughter, Julia (Nini Wacera), the second one, Pamela (Brenda Wairimu) and a son, Wanjala (Lwanda Jawar). Julia later inherits her father's project, a boxing gym, where she has to step into a man's shoes in an evidently chauvinistic society, where men set the rules.

Cast 
Nini Wacera as Julia Oyange
Lwanda Jawar as Wanjala Oyange
Brenda Wairimu as Pamela Oyange
Muthoni Gathecha as Ayira Oyange
Janet Sision as Wangui
Laura Walubengo as Mumbi, a journalist
Arabron Nnyneque as Abasi
Lenny Juma as Jimmy 
Abubakar Mwenda as Simon
Robert Agengo
 Cleopatra Koheirwe as Jakki

Broadcast 
Broadcasters that carry Kona are Africa Magic Entertainment and Maisha Magic East. Africa Magic Entertainment originally broadcast it on weeknights at 7:30 pm from 16 August 2013 to 8 August 2014, taking exactly one year. It debuted on Maisha Magic in September 2014.

References

External links 

 Website

2013 Kenyan television series debuts
English-language television shows
Kenyan television soap operas
Kenyan telenovelas
2014 Kenyan television series endings
2010s Kenyan television series
Africa Magic original programming